Mortadelo & Filemon : The Big Adventure  is a 2003 Spanish-language film based on the popular Spanish comic book series Mortadelo y Filemón by Francisco Ibáñez Talavera. It also included characters from 13, Rue del Percebe, another comic by the same creator. The film was directed by Javier Fesser and stars Benito Pocino and Pepe Viyuela. It became the second highest-grossing Spanish film of all time.

Plot
The adventure begins when a spy breaks into Professor Bacterio's lab and steals some of his inventions from the T.I.A. headquarters (Técnicos de Investigación Aeroterráquea, "Tía" being the Spanish word for "Aunt", thus a spoof of the CIA). Mortadelo and Filemón who work for the T.I.A. are put on the case, but Fredy, another agent, decides to beat them to it. One of the inventions is a weather control machine which the spy decides to sell to the President of Tirania, a small Eastern European dictatorship. There are numerous clashes between the spy, Fredy, and Mortadelo and Filemón (who Fredy seems to want to kill). Our heroes end up in prison after accidentally beating up the local cop once too often. They escape, Filemon's mother gets kidnapped by Fredy and taken to Tirania. The spy is killed in Fredy's place as Fredy ingratiates himself with the President, while having Filemón's mother tortured. The heroes arrive and there is a big battle where Filemón is apparently killed. Then Mortadelo receives a mortal wound, but Filemón gives him a cup of water, which turns out to be the Holy Grail, Mortadelo drinks it and heals quickly, while Fredy gets his just deserts. Mortadelo and Filemón return home, their mission successfully accomplished.

Cast
 Benito Pocino as Mortadelo
 Pepe Viyuela as Filemón
 Dominique Pinon as Fredy
 Paco Sagarzazu as The President
 Mariano Venancio as Superintendent Vincente (their boss at T.I.A.)
  as Professor Bacterio
  as Ofelia (Vincente's secretary)
 Gustamante as a mosquito (CGI insect)
 María Isbert as Filemón's mother
 Emilio Gavira as Rompetechos
  as President's servant
  as The spy who started it all off
 Paco Hidalgo as President's torturer
 Javier Aller as Mickey El Gigante
  as Security guard at T.I.A.
 Joan Gadea as a crooked shopkeeper.
 Juan Peiró as someone who keeps getting run over
 Andrés Gasch as Matraca, a very large man who has it in for Filemon
 Manuel Pizarro as a thief
 Coyito Fernández as a cop
 Emiliana Olmedo as Queen Elizabeth II
 The people of Gijón (crowd scene at palace, which was the Universidad Laboral)
 The people of Valencia where much of it was filmed including the final parade and also Madrid.

Reception

Box office
The film set an opening weekend record for a Spanish film with a gross of €5.1 million, second only to Harry Potter and the Chamber of Secrets. It grossed 22.8 million euros in Spain, becoming the second highest-grossing Spanish film of all-time behind Los otros (2001).

Sequels
There is a second film about the comic duo named Mort & Phil. Mission: Save Earth (2008).

See also 
 List of Spanish films of 2003

References

External links 
 
 

2003 films
Films based on Spanish comics
Mort & Phil
Films set in a fictional country
Films shot in Madrid
Spanish spy comedy films
2000s spy comedy films
Live-action films based on comics
2003 comedy films
2000s Spanish films
2000s Spanish-language films